Alan Stenhouse Gourley (13 April 1909 – 9 September 1991) was a South African-British painter and stained glass artist.

He attended the Glasgow School of Art in 1928 and the Edinburgh College of Art between 1929 and 1931. He moved to South Africa where he created stained glass windows for cathedrals in Pretoria and Johannesburg and taught at Johannesburg Technical College between 1932 and 1937. He then moved to Paris where he studied at the École des Beaux-Arts between 1938 and 1940 and was instructor in camouflage during the Second World War. A carpet designed by him is located at South Africa House.

His work was part of the painting event in the art competition at the 1936 Summer Olympics representing South Africa.

References

1909 births
1991 deaths
20th-century South African painters
South African male painters
Olympic competitors in art competitions
People from Ayr
Alumni of the Glasgow School of Art
British alumni of the École des Beaux-Arts
Alumni of the Edinburgh College of Art
20th-century British painters
British male painters
South African stained glass artists and manufacturers
British stained glass artists and manufacturers
British emigrants to South Africa
20th-century British male artists